Pillai Nilla is a 1985 Indian Tamil-language psychological horror film directed by Manobala, and written by P. Kalaimani. The film stars Mohan, Raadhika, Jaishankar, Nalini, and Baby Shalini. It was released on 14 April 1985 and emerged a commercial success.

Plot 

Dolly is the young sister of a widowed rich man named David. She falls in love with Mohan, who works in her office. When she tries to express her love, she flies abroad for an office matter. Meanwhile, in India, Mohan's mother arranges his marriage with his cousin Bhuvana, and he marries her. When Dolly returns from abroad on her birthday, she expresses her love to Mohan, but he rejects her because his wife is pregnant. Dolly's obsession causes her to commit suicide in front of him at the hospital. At the same time, as his wife is giving birth. Their daughter, Shalini, is imbued with Dolly's evil spirit as Dolly takes revenge. What happens next is the rest of the story.

Cast 
Mohan as Mohan
Raadhika as Dolly
Jaishankar as David
Nalini as Bhuvana
Baby Shalini as Shalini
Sathyaraj as Saint Cromeo (guest appearance)
Janagaraj as Dolly's secretary
Thengai Srinivasan as Kanagasabapathy Principal
Chinni Jayanth as Sekar
Peeli Sivam
Pasi Narayanan as Oomaithurai

Production 
After his directorial debut Agaya Gangai (1982) failed, Manobala did not get any further offers to direct which left him depressed and he contemplated suicide. P. Kalaimani approached Manobala to direct a film for him which was titled Muthal Vasantham; however the partners of Kalaimani were uninterested in having Manobala as director and replaced him with Manivannan. Despite this Kalaimani promised Manobala to direct a film which eventually became Pillai Nila.

The film took inspiration from various horror films such as Christine (1983), Poltergeist (1982), The Omen (1976) and The Exorcist (1973). The makers sought to avoid clichéd horror film tropes such as haunted houses, "sex-charged teenagers" and "unrealistic monsters in rubber masks".

Soundtrack 
The music was composed by Ilaiyaraaja with lyrics by Vaali, Vairamuthu, Muthulingam and Mu. Metha. It took Ilaiyaraaja six days to finish the film's re-recording.

Release and reception 
Pillai Nila was released on 14 April 1985, Puthandu. Despite facing competition from other films released in the same week including Mohan's own films Udaya Geetham and Deivapiravi, it emerged a commercial success. Jayamanmadhan of Kalki wrote the first half was not so boring, but the second half did not test his patience at all. He praised Ashok Kumar's cinematography, performances of Mohan, Nalini and Shalini but felt the climax was absurd.

References

External links 

1980s psychological horror films
1980s Tamil-language films
1985 films
1985 horror films
Films about reincarnation
Films directed by Manobala
Films scored by Ilaiyaraaja
Films set in Bangalore
Films set in Chennai
Indian psychological horror films